Carl Alexander Schuke (14 August 1870 – 16 November 1933) was a German organ builder and from 1894 to 1933 owner and manager of the . The company still exists today.

Life 
In 1885, he came to Potsdam and attended the Viktoria-Gymnasium, today . After graduating from high school, he learned the organ building trade from master organ builder Carl Eduard Gesell. After Gesell's death in 1894, Schuke bought the company and thus took over the business. Through his temporary work at the organ building company Sauer from Frankfurt (Oder), he was able to gain experience in contemporary modern organ building techniques, which he brought into his company and thus made his workshop one of the best known organ building companies.

After his death in Potsdam at the age of 63, his sons Karl Schuke and Hans-Joachim Schuke continued to run the company together. Approximately 140 organs were built during Alexander Schuke's tenure.

References

Further reading 
 Alexander Schuke Potsdam Orgelbau GmbH: 100 Jahre Alexander Schuke Orgelbau in Potsdam. Thomasius verlag – Thomas Helms, Schwerin 1994

External links 
 Schuke, Karl Alexander on BMLO
 Catalogue raisonné. The catalogue contains all new constructions, alterations and repairs by Alexander Schuke, with details of the stops, manuals and pedals.

German pipe organ builders
1870 births
1933 deaths